Two Paddocks is a wine producer based in Central Otago, New Zealand. It is owned and operated by actor Sam Neill.

History

Alex Paddocks is a  vineyard on a terrace above the Earnscleugh Valley under some rocky headlands. It was planted with Burgundian Pinot Noir vines (5, 6, 115) in 1998.

In 2000, the company acquired Redbank Paddocks, a sheltered , also in the Earnscleugh Valley, which nestles between two rocky escarpments. It is planted with more Burgundian clones (777, 667, and 115) and some Riesling.

In 2001, Two Paddocks acquired an interest in another winery, The Central Otago Wine Company, with an approximate production of 3,000 cases of wine a year.

The original vineyard, First Paddock, was augmented by two other small vineyards in the Alexandra district. After incorporating a second vineyard established by neighbouring film director Roger Donaldson, Neill changed to the current name. Donaldson eventually built another vineyard, Sleeping Dogs, named after the 1977 film, which had marked his directorial debut and Neill's first feature film.

"The Last Chance" Pinot Noir is a single vineyard bottling from the Alex Paddocks plot, its first vintage in 2002. The company also produces the second label Picnic, largely with sourced fruit, with bottlings of Pinot Noir, Sauvignon Blanc, and Riesling varietals. Two Paddocks also grows medicinal and culinary herbs, such as lavender oil and saffron.

See also
 The Central Otago wine region
 List of celebrities who own wineries and vineyards

References

External links
 Official site
 Background information on Gibbston Valley vineyards

Wineries of New Zealand
Otago
New Zealand brands